Lake City station is a former train station in Lake City, Florida. It was formerly served by Amtrak, the national railroad passenger system. Service was suspended after Hurricane Katrina struck the Gulf Coast in 2005.

References

External links

 
Lake City Amtrak Station (USA Rail Guide -- Train Web)
Lake Baikal - Information about the lake.

Former Amtrak stations in Florida
Railway stations closed in 2005
Amtrak station
2005 disestablishments in Florida
Transportation buildings and structures in Columbia County, Florida
Railway stations in the United States opened in 1993